Tumbi Umbi is a mostly semi-rural suburb of the Central Coast region of New South Wales, Australia, located northwest of Bateau Bay along Wyong Road. It is part of the  local government area.

History

Tumbi Umbi is an Aboriginal expression meaning place of tall trees.

Tumbi Umbi Secondary College opened in 1996.

Geography
It is a somewhat distributed community on the shores of Tuggerah Lake and associated with the creek that feeds into that body of water. In Aboriginal times the description "A place of much water" accurately described the swamp land that has now been extensively drained and populated with housing, industrial estates, a school, Mingara Recreation Club, Mingara One Fitness and Aquatic Centre, a pistol range and Glengara Retirement Village.

The more urbanised part of the suburb can be found along Wyong Road adjacent to Berkeley Vale, Killarney Vale and Bateau Bay. The more rural part is situated around Tumbi Road and Palm Valley Road, adjacent to Glenning Valley, Wamberal and Forresters Beach.

It is situated a short distance from the coast.

References

Suburbs of the Central Coast (New South Wales)